Chankatagh or Janyatag is a village de facto in the Martakert Province of the breakaway Republic of Artsakh, de jure in the Tartar District of Azerbaijan, in the disputed region of Nagorno-Karabakh. The village has an ethnic Armenian-majority population, and also had an Armenian majority in 1989.

History 
During the Soviet period, the village was a part of the Mardakert District of the Nagorno-Karabakh Autonomous Oblast.

Historical heritage sites 
Historical heritage sites in and around the village include tombs from the 1st century BCE, a medieval village and cemetery, a 13th-century khachkar, St. George's Church built in 1609, and a 17th-century chapel.

Economy and culture 
The population is mainly engaged in agriculture, animal husbandry, and mining. As of 2015, the village has a municipal building, a house of culture, a secondary school, three shops, and a medical centre.

Demographics 
The village had 272 inhabitants in 2005, and 385 inhabitants in 2015.

References

External links 
 

Populated places in Martakert Province
Populated places in Tartar District